Heuristic, or heuristic technique, is any approach to problem solving or self-discovery that employs a practical method that is not guaranteed to be optimal, perfect, or rational, but is nevertheless sufficient for reaching an immediate, short-term goal or approximation. Where finding an optimal solution is impossible or impractical, heuristic methods can be used to speed up the process of finding a satisfactory solution. Heuristics can be mental shortcuts that ease the cognitive load of making a decision.

Examples that employ heuristics include using trial and error, a rule of thumb or an educated guess.

Heuristics are the strategies derived from previous experiences with similar problems. These strategies depend on using readily accessible, though loosely applicable, information to control problem solving in human beings, machines and abstract issues. When an individual applies a heuristic in practice, it generally performs as expected. However it can alternatively create systematic errors.

The most fundamental heuristic is trial and error, which can be used in everything from matching nuts and bolts to finding the values of variables in algebra problems. In mathematics, some common heuristics involve the use of visual representations, additional assumptions, forward/backward reasoning and simplification. Here are a few commonly used heuristics from George Pólya's 1945 book, How to Solve It: This is because only the general problem can provide to a specific problem—a context from which to draw meaning.

In psychology, heuristics are simple, efficient rules, either learned or inculcated by evolutionary processes. These psychological heuristics have been proposed to explain how people make decisions, come to judgements, and solve problems. These rules typically come into play when people face complex problems or incomplete information. Researchers employ various methods to test whether people use these rules. The rules have been shown to work well under most circumstances, but in certain cases can lead to systematic errors or cognitive biases.

History
The study of heuristics in human decision-making was developed in the 1970s and the 1980s, by the psychologists Amos Tversky and Daniel Kahneman, although the concept had been originally introduced by the Nobel laureate Herbert A. Simon. Simon's original primary object of research was problem solving that showed that we operate within what he calls bounded rationality. He coined the term satisficing, which denotes a situation in which people seek solutions, or accept choices or judgements, that are "good enough" for their purposes although they could be optimised.

Rudolf Groner analysed the history of heuristics from its roots in ancient Greece up to contemporary work in cognitive psychology and artificial intelligence, proposing a cognitive style "heuristic versus algorithmic thinking", which can be assessed by means of a validated questionnaire.

Adaptive toolbox
Gerd Gigerenzer and his research group argued that models of heuristics need to be formal to allow for predictions of behavior that can be tested. They study the fast and frugal heuristics in the "adaptive toolbox" of individuals or institutions, and the ecological rationality of these heuristics; that is, the conditions under which a given heuristic is likely to be successful. The descriptive study of the "adaptive toolbox" is done by observation and experiment, the prescriptive study of the ecological rationality requires mathematical analysis and computer simulation. Heuristics – such as the recognition heuristic, the take-the-best heuristic and fast-and-frugal trees – have been shown to be effective in predictions, particularly in situations of uncertainty. It is often said that heuristics trade accuracy for effort but this is only the case in situations of risk. Risk refers to situations where all possible actions, their outcomes and probabilities are known. In the absence of this information, that is under uncertainty, heuristics can achieve higher accuracy with lower effort. This finding, known as a less-is-more effect, would not have been found without formal models. The valuable insight of this program is that heuristics are effective not despite their simplicity — but because of it. Furthermore, Gigerenzer and Wolfgang Gaissmaier found that both individuals and organisations rely on heuristics in an adaptive way.

Cognitive-experiential self-theory
Heuristics, through greater refinement and research, have begun to be applied to other theories, or be explained by them. For example, the cognitive-experiential self-theory (CEST) also is an adaptive view of heuristic processing. CEST breaks down two systems that process information. At some times, roughly speaking, individuals consider issues rationally, systematically, logically, deliberately, effortfully and verbally. On other occasions, individuals consider issues intuitively, effortlessly, globally, and emotionally. From this perspective, heuristics are part of a larger experiential processing system that is often adaptive, but vulnerable to error in situations that require logical analysis.

Attribute substitution
In 2002, Daniel Kahneman and Shane Frederick proposed that cognitive heuristics work by a process called attribute substitution, which happens without conscious awareness. According to this theory, when somebody makes a judgement (of a "target attribute") that is computationally complex, a more easily calculated "heuristic attribute" is substituted. In effect, a cognitively difficult problem is dealt with by answering a rather simpler problem, without being aware of this happening. This theory explains cases where judgements fail to show regression toward the mean. Heuristics can be considered to reduce the complexity of clinical judgments in health care.

Psychology

Philosophy
A heuristic device is used when an entity X exists to enable understanding of, or knowledge concerning, some other entity Y.

A good example is a model that, as it is never identical with what it models, is a heuristic device to enable understanding of what it models. Stories, metaphors, etc., can also be termed heuristic in this sense. A classic example is the notion of utopia as described in Plato's best-known work, The Republic. This means that the "ideal city" as depicted in The Republic is not given as something to be pursued, or to present an orientation-point for development. Rather, it shows how things would have to be connected, and how one thing would lead to another (often with highly problematic results), if one opted for certain principles and carried them through rigorously.

Heuristic is also often used as a noun to describe a rule-of-thumb, procedure, or method. Philosophers of science have emphasised the importance of heuristics in creative thought and the construction of scientific theories. Seminal works include Karl Popper's The Logic of Scientific Discovery and others by Imre Lakatos, Lindley Darden, and William C. Wimsatt.

Law
In legal theory, especially in the theory of law and economics, heuristics are used in the law when case-by-case analysis would be impractical, insofar as "practicality" is defined by the interests of a governing body.

The present securities regulation regime largely assumes that all investors act as perfectly rational persons.
In truth, actual investors face cognitive limitations from biases, heuristics, and framing effects. For instance, in all states in the United States the legal drinking age for unsupervised persons is 21 years, because it is argued that people need to be mature enough to make decisions involving the risks of alcohol consumption. However, assuming people mature at different rates, the specific age of 21 would be too late for some and too early for others. In this case, the somewhat arbitrary delineation is used because it is impossible or impractical to tell whether an individual is sufficiently mature for society to trust them with that kind of responsibility. Some proposed changes, however, have included the completion of an alcohol education course rather than the attainment of 21 years of age as the criterion for legal alcohol possession. This would put youth alcohol policy more on a case-by-case basis and less on a heuristic one, since the completion of such a course would presumably be voluntary and not uniform across the population.

The same reasoning applies to patent law. Patents are justified on the grounds that inventors must be protected so they have incentive to invent. It is therefore argued that it is in society's best interest that inventors receive a temporary government-granted monopoly on their idea, so that they can recoup investment costs and make economic profit for a limited period. In the United States, the length of this temporary monopoly is 20 years from the date the patent application was filed, though the monopoly does not actually begin until the application has matured into a patent. However, like the drinking-age problem above, the specific length of time would need to be different for every product to be efficient. A 20-year term is used because it is difficult to tell what the number should be for any individual patent. More recently, some, including University of North Dakota law professor Eric E. Johnson, have argued that patents in different kinds of industries – such as software patents – should be protected for different lengths of time.

Stereotyping
Stereotyping is a type of heuristic that people use to form opinions or make judgements about things they have never seen or experienced. They work as a mental shortcut to assess everything from the social status of a person (based on their actions), to whether a plant is a tree based on the assumption that it is tall, has a trunk and has leaves (even though the person making the evaluation might never have seen that particular type of tree before).

Stereotypes, as first described by journalist Walter Lippmann in his book Public Opinion (1922), are the pictures we have in our heads that are built around experiences as well as what we are told about the world.

Artificial intelligence
A heuristic can be used in artificial intelligence systems while searching a solution space. The heuristic is derived by using some function that is put into the system by the designer, or by adjusting the weight of branches based on how likely each branch is to lead to a goal node.

See also

 Algorithm
 Behavioral economics
 Failure mode and effects analysis
 Heuristics in judgment and decision-making 
 Ideal type
 List of biases in judgment and decision making
 Neuroheuristics
 Predictive coding
 Priority heuristic
 Social heuristics
 Thought experiment

References

Further reading
 How To Solve It: Modern Heuristics, Zbigniew Michalewicz and David B. Fogel, Springer Verlag, 2000. 
 
 The Problem of Thinking Too Much, 11 December 2002, Persi Diaconis

 
Problem solving methods